The Thin Shrink Small Outline Package (TSSOP) is a rectangular surface mount plastic integrated circuit (IC) package with gull-wing leads.

Application 
They are suited for applications requiring 1 mm or less mounted height and are commonly used in analog and operation amplifiers, controllers and Drivers, Logic, Memory, and RF/Wireless, Disk drives, video/audio and consumer electronics.

Physical properties  
The Thin shrink small outline package has a smaller body and smaller lead pitch than the standard SOIC package. It is also smaller and thinner than a TSOP with the same lead count. Body widths are 3.0 mm, 4.4 mm and 6.1 mm. The lead counts range from 8 to 80 pins. The lead pitches are 0.5 or 0.65 mm.

Exposed Pad 
Some TSSOP packages have an exposed pad. This is a rectangular metal pad on the bottom side of the package. The exposed pad will be soldered on the pcb to transfer heat from the package to the pcb. In most applications, the exposed pad is connected to ground.

HTSSOP 
The Heat sink thin shrink small outline package (HTSSOP) is Texas Instruments name for a TSSOP with an exposed pad on the bottom side. There are some other manufacturers who use the same name.

See also 
 List of integrated circuit packaging types
 Small outline integrated circuit

Similar package types 
 Shrink Small Outline Package
 Mini Small Outline Package
 Small outline integrated circuit

References

External links 

 Soldering a TSSOP chip by hand

Semiconductor packages